Vexitomina is a genus of sea snails, marine gastropod mollusks in the family Horaiclavidae.

Species
Species within the genus Vexitomina include:
 Vexitomina coriorudis (Hedley, 1922)
 Vexitomina coxi (Angas, 1867)
 Vexitomina metcalfei (Angas, 1867)
 Vexitomina radulaeformis (Weinkauff & Kobelt, 1876)
 Vexitomina regia (Reeve, 1842)
 Vexitomina sinensis Ma, 1989
 Vexitomina suavis (Smith E. A., 1888)
 Vexitomina torquata Laseron, 1954
Species brought into synonymy
 Vexitomina chinensis Ma, 1989: synonym of Paradrillia patruelis (E. A. Smith, 1875)
 Vexitomina garrardi Laseron, 1954: synonym of Vexitomina coxi (Angas, 1867)
 Vexitomina optabilis (Murdock & Suter, 1906): synonym of Awateria optabilis (R. Murdoch & Suter, 1906)
 Vexitomina pilazona Laseron, 1954: synonym of Vexitomina torquata Laseron, 1954

References

 Powell, 1942 [Bulletin of the Auckland Institute and Museum, 2: 77]
 Laseron, C. 1954. Revision of the New South Wales Turridae (Mollusca). Australian Zoological Handbook. Sydney : Royal Zoological Society of New South Wales 1-56, pls 1-12. 
 Powell, A.W.B. 1966. The molluscan families Speightiidae and Turridae, an evaluation of the valid taxa, both Recent and fossil, with list of characteristic species. Bulletin of the Auckland Institute and Museum. Auckland, New Zealand 5: 1-184, pls 1-23 
 Powell, A.W.B. 1969. The family Turridae in the Indo-Pacific. Part. 2. The subfamily Turriculinae. Indo-Pacific Mollusca 2(10): 207-415, pls 188-324
 Wilson, B. 1994. Australian Marine Shells. Prosobranch Gastropods. Kallaroo, WA : Odyssey Publishing Vol. 2 370 pp.

External links
  Tucker, J.K. 2004 Catalog of recent and fossil turrids (Mollusca: Gastropoda). Zootaxa 682:1-1295.
  Bouchet, P.; Kantor, Y. I.; Sysoev, A.; Puillandre, N. (2011). A new operational classification of the Conoidea. Journal of Molluscan Studies. 77, 273-308

 
Horaiclavidae
Gastropod genera